Shiratori is a Japanese surname. The surname literally translates to swan in Japanese. Notable people with the surname include:

Azusa Shiratori, character in Ranma ½
Chieko Shiratori (born 1975), Japanese actress
Emiko Shiratori (born 1950), Japanese singer and songwriter
Hitomi Shiratori or Yoshiki (born 1965), Japanese musician, songwriter, composer and record producer
, Japanese boxer
Katsuhiro Shiratori (born 1976), beach volleyball player from Japan
Shiratori Kurakichi (1865–1942), Japanese historian and Sinologist
Sumio Shiratori, Japanese composer and music producer
Tetsu Shiratori (born 1972), Japanese voice actor
Toshio Shiratori (1887–1949), Japanese ambassador to Italy 1938–1940, one of the 14 Class-A war criminals enshrined at Yasukuni
Yoshie Shiratori (1907–1979), Japanese anti-hero who escaped from prison four times
Yuri Shiratori (born 1968), Japanese voice actress and J-pop singer from Kanagawa Prefecture who released various solo CD albums
Yuriko Shiratori (born 1983), Japanese gravure idol, tarento artist and actress
The Shiratori sisters, characters in the 2007 rhythm video game Moero! Nekketsu Rhythm Damashii Osu! Tatakae! Ouendan 2

See also
Shinano-Shiratori Station
Shirati
Sirtori

Japanese-language surnames